The Organic Food Development Center (OFDC; full name: Organic Food Development Center, SEPA of China) is an organic certification organization in China. It was founded in 1994 and is based in Nanjing. It is a branch of China's State Environmental Protection Administration, or SEPA. It was certified by the International Federation of Organic Movements in 2002.

References

External links
Organic Food Development Center official site

1994 establishments in China
Nanjing
Agricultural organizations based in China
Organic food certification organizations